Shannon Hurley is an American singer and songwriter. She was born in South Bend, Indiana and currently lives and works in Los Angeles. She was voted by Rolling Stone as one of the top 25 artists on Myspace in 2006. Music from her 2007 debut album Ready To Wake Up was licensed by Muzak and has been played in department stores and restaurants throughout the world. Her music can be heard on television shows like The Young and the Restless, 90210, So You Think You Can Dance, American Idol and Giuliana and Bill, among others. Shannon's second full-length album, California, was released independently in July 2011 and her third full-length album, The Light, was released in 2014. She is also producer and main songwriter in the downtempo duo Lovers & Poets, along with husband and bassist Ben Eisen. Their self-titled debut album was released in 2010. Shannon was invited to be a featured vocalist on "Sun Gone Down", a track by Protoculture released in July 2011 on Re*brand/Armada Music. She has since become a sought-after vocalist and songwriter in the trance community. She has collaborated with trance producers such as Giuseppe Ottaviani, Ronski Speed and Alex M.O.R.P.H.

Early life 
Shannon began studying music and singing at an early age. Her grandmother was a performer in vaudeville and her mother and aunt sang in several local bands. Shannon learned piano at age 8. Her family moved to Colorado Springs while she was a teenager. She took up trombone and enrolled at the University of Colorado at Boulder, where she earned a degree in music composition. While a student at CU, she composed and published a sonata for piano and trombone. Shannon became the stage manager for Boulder's Fox Theatre, working with such artists as Bonnie Raitt, Willie Nelson and Julian Lennon. Shannon studied songwriting under Patrick Leonard, who wrote many hit songs for Madonna, such as "Live to Tell" and "Like a Prayer". During this time, Shannon began playing in bands around Boulder, including a folk trio named Frieden and the jam band Jyemo, who toured the midwest and mountain region throughout the 1990s and 2000s.

Music career 
After graduating from college, Shannon moved to Los Angeles in 2001. She joined Planet Earth, a tribute to Duran Duran. It was in this band that she met bass player and future husband/collaborator Ben Eisen. Shannon began writing songs, and they toured the grueling open mic circuit of Los Angeles. In 2003, Shannon recorded her self-titled EP and she toured the west coast in support. In 2004, Shannon co-founded Don't Call Us Tori, a showcase for Los Angeles' best female singer songwriters, which included Kyler England of The Rescues, Kat Parsons, and Marina V. Shannon also performed as a touring keyboardist for former Disney Channel star Brie Larson, seen on the Showtime series United States of Tara and the film Scott Pilgrim vs. The World.

Shannon recorded her second EP, Sunrise in 2006. She began to gain a sizeable following online, utilizing social networking websites and garnering praise from Rolling Stone, who listed her as one of their Top 25 Bands on Myspace, along with notable artists like The Airborne Toxic Event. Rolling Stone called Shannon's music "something you could see playing in a college dorm room of the girl you're making a move on." Shannon's full-length debut Ready to Wake Up was released in November 2007. The album featured tracks produced by Guy Erez and Michael Woodrum, and was applauded by many in the blogosphere like the site Lyrical Venus and numerous online radio stations like KGRL and Sirius XM Radio The music licensing company Muzak picked up on the album and began playing tracks from it in their thousands of stores, malls and restaurants throughout the world. While continually writing, Shannon performed live and toured with Russian-born singer songwriter Marina V and was featured on her albums Live at Soundmoves, Modern Fairytale and My Star. In 2008, Shannon decided to submit tracks from Ready to Wake Up to the music sampling and remixing site CCmixter, inviting fans to cut up pieces of her songs and remix them. She received hundreds of entries, the best of which were released as the album Second Light: The Ready To Wake Up Remixes, which was released in December 2008.

In February 2009, Shannon and Ben moved to Nashville, Tennessee. While she worked on songs for her follow-up album, Shannon was directed to an ad on Craigslist posted by local producer Bryan Talbot, who was looking for a pop songwriter with songs to add electronic and ambient beats to. Inspired by the overwhelming response to her remix contest, Shannon decided to pursue the new project. Titled Lovers and Poets, the band featured Bryan and Shannon's production efforts, Ben Eisen's bass lines and Shannon's pop songs. Shannon and Bryan eventually parted ways over creative differences, but the project continued, this time as Shannon and Ben. In August 2010, Lovers and Poets released their self-titled debut album, to much critical praise from blog sites like We All Want Someone To Shout For and Keeping an Ear Out,. In October 2010, several tracks from the album were featured on the ACE Broadcasting Network podcast The Film Vault.

Shannon spent three months as a lounge performer at the Park Hyatt in Ho Chi Minh City, Vietnam from December 2009 to March 2010. She performed at the Park Lounge six nights a week to packed audiences. While in Vietnam, Shannon watched the devastation of the earthquake that ravaged Haiti in January 2010, and decided to team up with her musician friends all over the world. Together they created Songs For Haiti, a compilation of songs of hope. All proceeds went to OXFAM America, a non-profit organization dedicated to ending poverty and aiding in disaster relief. Songs For Haiti featured many well known artists, such as Peter Murphy, Leigh Nash and Jenni Alpert.

In April 2010, Shannon and Ben moved back to Los Angeles and once work on the Lovers and Poets album was complete, Shannon began focusing on her follow-up. An early single from this album called Beg Steal Borrow was used in the web soap opera Venice: The Series in November 2010.

In the fall of 2010, Shannon was approached by songwriter and producer Aruna to sing on a trance track she had penned with Sir Adrian and Raz Nitzan. Nitzan had Shannon in mind to sing it after he discovered her album with Lovers & Poets on the music site Amie Street. The song debuted at Armin van Buuren's A State of Trance festival 500 in Johannesburg, South Africa in a set by Protoculture on March 18, 2011. Sun Gone Down premiered on A State of Trance Radio (#511) as track of the week on June 2, 2011. On July 4, 2011 Re*brand/Armada Music released "Sun Gone Down" with an extra mix by Alex M.O.R.P.H. and Chriss Ortega. This single introduced Shannon to the world of trance music and she became a sought-after vocalist and songwriter in the trance community. Since 2012, she has collaborated with Lange, Ronski Speed, Giuseppe Ottaviani, The Thrillseekers and others.

Shannon produced all but three tracks on her second full-length album California. It was released on her imprint For Lenore Records in July 2011. California featured the singles "California" and "Slow Down", both produced by Guy Erez. Shannon's third full-length album, The Light, was released in February 2014. Shannon is currently at work with Ben Eisen on a second Lovers and Poets album and her fourth solo album, both slated for release later.

Discography

Albums
Shannon Hurley (EP) (2003)
Sunrise (EP) (2006)
Ready to Wake Up (2007)
Second Light: The Ready to Wake Up Remixes (2008)
Lovers and Poets (2010) (released under Lovers & Poets)
California (2011)
The Light (2014)
Switch It On (2015)
Lovers & Poets II (released under Lovers & Poets) (2016)
New Day (2017) (New album by Shannon)

Trance Singles
Sun Gone Down (2011) (released under Protoculture featuring Shannon Hurley)
My Heart Is Breaking (2011) (with Indivision)
Lost in Space (2012) (with Julian Vincent)
I Want to Believe (2012) (with Andy Duguid)
Monday Morning Madness (2012) (with Alex M.O.R.P.H.)
Love Survives (2012) (with Tenishia and Ruben De Ronde)
Something to Say (2012) (with Stonevalley)
I Am Your Shadow (2013) (with Giuseppe Ottaviani)
Superstars (2013) (with Lange)
Summer Always Ends (2014) (with Ronski Speed)
A Little Rain (2014) (with Mike Shiver)
Voice in the Crowd (2014) (with Misja Helsloot)
An Open Heart (2015) (with Hazem Beltagui)
Color The Sky (2015) (with Feel)
Stay (Here With Me) [Club Mix] (2017) (With The Thrillseekers)
A Little Solitude (2017) (with Bissen, included a remix by Mohamed Ragab)

References

External links 
 Shannon Hurley Official Website
 Lovers and Poets Official Website
 Shannon Hurley on cdbaby
 Shannon Hurley on thesixtyone
 Shannon Hurley on Tradiio
 Shannon Hurley on SoundCloud

Living people
American women singer-songwriters
Writers from South Bend, Indiana
Musicians from Los Angeles
Musicians from South Bend, Indiana
University of Colorado Boulder alumni
Singer-songwriters from California
Year of birth missing (living people)
21st-century American women
Singer-songwriters from Indiana